Adriatic may refer to one of several ships named after the Adriatic Sea:

 was built at Sunderland in 1810. She sailed to the West Indies and the Cape of Good Hope. There is no evidence that she sailed to India. She was wrecked at the Cape in 1822.
 was launched in 1811 in the United States. The British Royal Navy seized her in July 1812. She was sold in 1813 and her new owners named her Vittoria. She traded with the West Indies, the Mediterranean, and the Indian Ocean. She was last listed in 1834.

 Adriatic (1856 ship) was built at New York.  When she was launched in 1856, she was the largest ship in the world.  Adriatic was built by the Collins Line, but was not commercially successful and was sold to a series of owners.  She ultimately served as a hulk at the mouth of the Niger River, where she was abandoned in 1885.
 , ship was built in New York in 1861. the Confederate raider  captured and burned her in 1864.
 , operated by the White Star Line until 1898; scrapped soon after.
 , owned by Cockerline, Hull. Employed as a collier in Admiralty charter. Reported missing in October 1916 between Newport and Marseilles, presumed war loss.
  was an ocean liner of the White Star Line. She served as a troopship during World War I and after the war ended, she returned to passenger service. She was scrapped at Onomichi, Japan, in 1935.

Citations

Ship names